The Prince Albert Local Municipality council consists of seven members elected by mixed-member proportional representation. Four councillors are elected by first-past-the-post voting in four wards, while the remaining three are chosen from party lists so that the total number of party representatives is proportional to the number of votes received. In the election of 1 November 2021 no party obtained a majority of seats.

Results 
The following table shows the composition of the council after past elections.

December 2000 election

The following table shows the results of the 2000 election.

October 2002 floor crossing

In terms of the Eighth Amendment of the Constitution and the judgment of the Constitutional Court in United Democratic Movement v President of the Republic of South Africa and Others, in the period from 8–22 October 2002 councillors had the opportunity to cross the floor to a different political party without losing their seats.

In the Prince Albert council, two councillors from the Democratic Alliance (DA) crossed to the New National Party, which had formerly been part of the DA.

March 2006 election

The following table shows the results of the 2006 election.

May 2011 election

The following table shows the results of the 2011 election.

August 2016 election

The following table shows the results of the 2016 election.

November 2021 election

The following table shows the results of the 2021 election.

By-elections from November 2021
The following by-elections were held to fill vacant ward seats in the period from the election in November 2021.

The by-election took place after the Karoo Gemeenskap Party (KGP), in a coalition with the African National Congress (ANC) and Patriotic Alliance (PA), expelled its ward councillor and mayor Margy Jaftha for supporting the Democratic Alliance (DA) in a motion to replace the speaker and the deputy mayor with DA representatives. Jaftha subsequently stood for the DA against KGP leader Goliat Lottering, winning the seat, and earning the DA an outright majority on the council.

References

Prince Albert
Elections in the Western Cape